Universal science is a branch of metaphysics. In the work of Gottfried Wilhelm Leibniz, the universal science is the true logic. Plato's system of idealism, formulated using the teachings of Socrates, is a predecessor to the concept of universal science. It emphasizes on the first principles which appear to be the reasoning behind everything, emerging and being in state with everything.

See also 
 Architectonics

References

External links 
 Stephen Palmquist, Heading 6, Philosophy as the Theological Science

Philosophy of science
Gottfried Wilhelm Leibniz
Intellectual history
History of science